The 2016 European Badminton Championships were the 25th tournament of the European Badminton Championships. They were held in La Roche-sur-Yon, France, from 26 April–1 May 2016. The competitions were held in the Vendéspace.

Medalists

Medal table

Men's singles

Seeds

  Jan Ø. Jørgensen (final)
  Viktor Axelsen (champion)
  Marc Zwiebler (semifinals)
  Hans-Kristian Vittinghus (quarterfinals)
  Rajiv Ouseph (semifinals)
  Brice Leverdez (quarterfinals)
  Pablo Abian (quarterfinals)
  Raul Must (second round)

Section 1

Section 2

Section 3

Section 4

Finals

Women's singles

Seeds

  Carolina Marín (champion)
  Kirsty Gilmour (final)
  Line Kjaersfeldt (semifinals)
  Karin Schnaase (quarterfinals)
  Olga Konon (second round)
  Beatriz Corrales (quarterfinals)
  Kristína Gavnholt (third round)
  Linda Zetchiri (quarterfinals)

Section 1

Section 2

Section 3

Section 4

Finals

Men's doubles

Seeds

  Vladimir Ivanov / Ivan Sozonov (semifinals)
  Mads Conrad-Petersen / Mads Pieler Kolding (champion)
  Marcus Ellis / Chris Langridge (semifinals)
  Kim Astrup / Anders Skaarup Rasmussen (final)
  Mathias Boe / Mathias Christiansen (withdrew)
  Adam Cwalina / Przemyslaw Wacha (quarterfinals)
  Michael Fuchs / Johannes Schoettler (quarterfinals)
  Baptiste Careme / Ronan Labar (quarterfinals)

Top Half

Bottom Half

Finals

Women's doubles

Seeds

  Christinna Pedersen / Kamilla Rytter Juhl (champion)
  Eefje Muskens / Selena Piek (final)
  Gabriela Stoeva / Stefani Stoeva (quarterfinals)
  Johanna Goliszewski / Carla Nelte (quarterfinals)

Top Half

Bottom Half

Finals

Mixed doubles

Seeds

  Chris Adcock / Gabby Adcock (quarterfinals)
  Joachim Fischer Nielsen / Christinna Pedersen (champion)
  Jacco Arends / Selena Piek (semifinals)
  Robert Mateusiak / Nadieżda Zięba (first round)
  Michael Fuchs / Birgit Michels (quarterfinals)
  Vitalij Durkin / Nina Vislova (second round)
  Ronan Labar / Emilie Lefel (second round)
  Niclas Nohr / Sara Thygesen (final)

Top Half

Bottom Half

Finals

External links
European BadmintonChampionships 2016 at ''tournamentsoftware.com'

European Badminton Championships
European Badminton Championships
International sports competitions hosted by France
European Badminton
Badminton tournaments in France